Charles Kenneth "C. K." Williams (November 4, 1936 – September 20, 2015) was an American poet, critic and translator. Williams won many poetry awards. Flesh and Blood won the National Book Critics Circle Award in 1987. Repair (1999) won the 2000 Pulitzer Prize for Poetry, was a National Book Award finalist and won the Los Angeles Times Book Prize. The Singing won the 2003 National Book Award and Williams received the Ruth Lilly Poetry Prize in 2005. The 2012 film The Color of Time relates aspects of Williams' life using his poetry.

Life
The American poet C.K. Williams was born in Newark, New Jersey, on November 4, 1936. His parents were Paul B. Williams and Dossie Kasdin. His grandparents came to the USA from Kiev, then a Russian city, and Lvov, Ukraine.

He went to Columbia High School  in Maplewood, attended Bucknell University for one year, then moved on to and graduated from the University of Pennsylvania.

He started writing poetry during his second year at Penn, and half-way through junior year he left for Paris. At that time, he wrote "I fell into a period of lacerating loneliness. I'd always been a little shy but now something, maybe my uncertainty about my identity as a poet, my sense of being a pretender, made me all but mute with strangers: I used to stay all day in my hotel room, reading, trying to write, then I'd go out to eat by myself, and take endless, anguished walks." When he returned to Penn, he switched major from philosophy to English. He studied poetry with Morse Peckham, who also mentioned that T.S. Eliot had written that if you wanted to be a poet, you had to write poetry every day, a recommendation Williams applied in his writing life.

After graduating from Penn, he stayed in Philadelphia. His circle of friends included artists, carpenters, poets, a famous sociologist, photographers, musicians and film makers. He spent time with young architects who worked for Louis Kahn, and later wrote: "I realized that my image of the artist's calling had come almost entirely from Kahn: he was absolutely devoted to his craft, and expected the same dedication from everyone else." He published his first book, Lies, in 1969.

In 1963 he married Sarah Dean Jones, a printer who worked for Eugene Feldman at the Falcon Press in Philadelphia. The marriage ended in divorce. Their daughter, Jessie Williams Burns, founded Tursulowe Press in Philadelphia.

In 1973 he met Catherine Mauger. They married in 1975 and had a son, Jed Williams, a painter and the owner of an art gallery in Philadelphia. His paintings are often featured on the covers of Williams' books. Catherine and C.K. lived part of the year in the USA, and part of the year in Paris, France, and later in Normandy.

Williams began teaching in the mid-'70s at the YM-YWHA in Philadelphia. He also worked as an assistant group therapist. He taught creative writing at different universities, among them, Franklin and Marshall, the University of California at Irvine, Boston University, Brooklyn College, Columbia University, George Mason University and, starting in 1996, Princeton University. He traveled across the country, and out of the country, giving readings and poetry workshops. He also worked on translations, notably of two Greek tragedies.

After publishing his second book, I Am the Bitter Name, Williams said that he had felt like giving up writing. Then he was asked to read at a college of art in Philadelphia, and he decided to read some unfinished poems: "and I was astonished to realize that they were exactly what I'd been waiting for, though I hadn't known I'd been waiting for anything at all. The poems were long, ragged lines, they had a much more conversational tone than the poems I'd been writing. Most importantly, the new poems, while having a much more narrative structure than the older ones, also had much more direct mechanisms for tracing thoughts, perceptions and emotions; they gave me a way to deal more inclusively and exhaustively with my own mind than the poems I'd been writing until then. I began to write poetry again, with more conviction than ever, and more confidence, more of a sense of what I wanted to do (…) The scope of the poems, the certainty they gave me that I could deal thoroughly with themes that interested me, were enough to keep me going. They are the poems that were collected in With Ignorance and Tar."

C.K. Williams became a member of the American Academy of Arts and Letters in 2003. He had a wide circle of friends in the U.S. and in Europe, many of them artists and writers. He gave a last reading and interview at Drew University in June 2015. He was diagnosed with multiple myeloma in the summer of 2013. He died at home in Hopewell, New Jersey on September 20, 2015. Twenty days earlier, he had finished working on the manuscript of his last book of poems, Falling Ill.

Works
His first book, Lies, was published in 1969, and he published many collections of  poetry. His Collected Poems appeared in 2006, of which Peter Campion wrote in The Boston Globe: "Throughout the five decades represented in his new Collected Poems, Williams has maintained the most sincere, and largest, ambitions. Like Yeats and Lowell before him, he writes from the borderland between private and public life…(His poems) join skeptical intelligence and emotional sincerity, to make sense of the world and ourselves. C.K. Williams has set a new standard for American poetry."

His book Repair won the Pulitzer Prize in 2000, and in 2003 The Singing won the National Book Award. He also wrote essays, plays, children books and worked on translations. His last book of poetry, Falling Ill, was published in 2017, after his death.

Bibliography

Poetry
Collections
 A Day for Anne Frank, Falcon Press, Philadelphia, 1968.
 Lies, Houghton Mifflin Company, Boston, 1969.
 I Am the Bitter Name, Houghton Mifflin, Boston, 1972.
 With Ignorance, Houghton Mifflin, Boston, 1977.
 Tar, Random House, New York, 1983.
 The Lark. The Thrush. The Starling. Poems from Issa, Burning Deck Press, Providence, 1983.
 Flesh and Blood, Farrar Straus and Giroux, New York, 1987; Bloodaxe Books, Newcastle, 1988.
 Poems 1963–1983, Farrar Straus and Giroux, New York, 1988; Bloodaxe Books, Newcastle, 1988.
 Helen, Orchises Press, 1991.
 A Dream of Mind, Poems, Farrar Straus and Giroux, New York, 1992; Bloodaxe Books, Newcastle, 1992.
 Selected Poems, Farrar Straus and Giroux, 1994.
 New and Selected Poems, Bloodaxe Books, Newcastle, 1995.
 The Vigil, Farrar Straus and Giroux, 1997.
 Repair, Farrar Straus and Giroux; Bloodaxe Books, 1999.
 Love About Love, Ausable Press, 2001.
 The Singing, Farrar Straus and Giroux; Bloodaxe Books, 2003.
 Collected Poems,  Farrar Straus and Giroux; Bloodaxe Books, 2006.
 Creatures, Green Shade, Haverford, 2006.
 Wait, Farrar Straus and Giroux; Bloodaxe Books, 2010.
 Crossing State Lines, Farrar Straus and Giroux, 2011.
 Writers Writing Dying, Farrar Straus and Giroux, 2012.
 All at Once, Farrar, Straus and Giroux, 2014.
 Selected Later Poems, Farrar, Straus and Giroux, 2015
 Falling Ill, Farrar, Straus and Giroux, 2017
List of poems

Prose
 Misgivings, My Mother, My Father, Myself, Farrar Straus and Giroux, 2000.
 Catherine's Laughter, Sarabande Books, 2013.

Essays and criticism
 Poetry and Consciousness; University of Michigan Press, 1998.
 On Whitman, Princeton University Press, Princeton, NJ, 2010.
 In Time: Poets, Poems, and the Rest, University of Chicago Press, 2012.

Plays
 The Operated Jew
 Creatures of Love

Translations
 Women of Trachis, translated from Sophocles, with Gregory Dickerson, Oxford University Press, New York, London, 1978.
 The Lark, The Thrush, The Starling, Poems from Issa, Burning Deck, 1983.
 The Bacchae, translated from Euripides, with an introduction by Martha Nussbaum, Farrar Straus and Giroux, 1990.
 Canvas, translation from the Polish of Adam Zagajewski, with Renata Gorczynski and Benjamin Ivry, Farrar Straus and Giroux, 1991.
 Selected Poems of Francis Ponge, with John Montague and Margaret Guiton, Wake Forest University Press, 1994.

Books Published in French
 Chair et Sang, Orphée La Différence, 1993
 Gratitude, Editeurs Le Gui et Jacques Darras, 1996
 Anthologie Personnelle: Poèmes, Actes Sud, 2001
 Dissentiments, Actes Sud, 2006

Books edited
 The Selected and Last Poems of Paul Zweig, edited and with an introduction by C. K. Williams, Wesleyan University Press, 1989.
 The Essential Hopkins, edited and with an introduction by C. K. Williams, Ecco Press, 1993.

Children's books
 How the Nobble Was Finally Found, Harcourt-Houghton Mifflin, Boston, 2009.
 A Not Scary Story About Big Scary Things illustrated by Gabi Swiatkowska, Harcourt-Houghton Mifflin, 2010.

Miscellaneous
 Solitudes, a song cycle, set by Ronald Surak, 1970.
 Script consultant for a film by David Lynch, The Grandmother.
 Criminals, a film by Joseph Strick, narrative by C. K. Williams, 1994.
 Crossing State Lines, Farrar, Straus and Giroux, 2011.
 The Color of Time, a movie produced by James Franco, 2012.

Awards and honors
 John Simon Guggenheim Fellowship, 1974.
 Bernard Conner Prize, The Paris Review, 1983.
 Nominee, National Book Critics Circle Award, for Tar, 1983.
 National Endowment for the Arts Fellowship, 1985 and 1993.
 National Book Critics Circle Award for Poetry, for Flesh and Blood, 1987.
 Finalist, Pulitzer Prize, for Flesh and Blood, 1987.
 Jerome Shestack Prize, The American Poetry Review, 1988, 1996.
 Morton Dauwen Zabel Prize of the American Academy of Arts and Letters, 1989.
 Woodrow Wilson-Lila Wallace Fellow, 1992–93.
 Nominee, National Book Critics Circle Award, for A Dream of Mind, 1992.
 Lila Wallace-Reader's Digest Writer's Award, 1993.
 Harriet Monroe Poetry Award, Poetry, 1993.
 Nominee, National Book Critics Circle Award, for The Vigil, 1997.
 Finalist, Pulitzer Prize, for The Vigil, 1997.
 PEN/Voelcker Award for Poetry, 1998.
 Berlin Prize, American Academy in Berlin, 1998.
 Finalist, National Book Award, for Repair, 1999.
 American Academy of Arts and Letters Literature Award, 1999
 Weathertop Poetry Award for Repair, 2000.
 Maurice English Award for Repair, 2000.
 Los Angeles Times Book Award for Repair, 2000.
 Pulitzer Prize, for Repair, 2000.
 Pen/Albrand Memoir Award, for Misgivings, 2001.
 National Book Award, for The Singing, 2003.
 Ruth Lilly Poetry Prize, 2005.
 Milton Kessler Poetry Prize, Binghamton University, 2012.
 Jewish Book Prize, 2012.

Events
 A Piano and Poetry Recital.  Richard Goode and C.K. Williams : a Princeton University	concert on March 9, 2014 at Richardson Auditorium. The recital was recorded.
 Dedication of "Garden", a poem by C.K. Williams, in October 2016, in the Poetry Trail of the D & R Greenway Land Trust : 1, Preservation Place, Princeton, N.J. 08540.
 A Reading and Gathering to Celebrate the Life and Work of C.K. Williams took place at Kelly Writers House at Penn University in Philadelphia on April 11, 2016.  Recording available.
 A Tribute to C.K. Williams took place at The New School in New York City on February 22, 2017. The event was recorded.

References

Archives
 C. K. Williams Papers. Yale Collection of American Literature, Beinecke Rare Book and Manuscript Library, Yale University.

Further reading
Remembering Charlie (C.K.) Williams, by Tzvetan Todorov, in Salmagundi (magazine),
	— Spring-Summer 2016. In the same issue : an interview by Paul Magee.

Articles by Stuart Mitchner in Town Topics (newspaper), Princeton:
	— The Singing : A Book to Live With (June 9, 2004)
	— Remembering C.K. Williams (1936-2015) - His Music Becomes Our Music (September 23, 2015)
	— C.K. Williams' "Fearless Inventions" : A Last Look Into the "Dearest Distance" (January 6, 2016)
	— Doing Time at the Writers House With C.K. Williams, Chekhov and Shakespeare (April 20, 2016)
	— Symptoms of Love : The Abiding Presence in C.K. Williams Farewell Volume (February 8, 2017)

External links

 Poetry Foundation (U.S) biography accessed 2010-02-10
 Poetry Archive (U.K) biography and audio poetry recordings accessed 2010-02-10
 Encyclopædia Britannica profile
 A Poet Watches Himself as He Watches the World New York Times article,  December 25, 2006 accessed 2010-02-27
 Poet Marshals His Moral Passion Against the War New York Times article  January 13, 2005 accessed 2010-02-27
 
 "Poetry of youth and age" (TED2001) accessed 2010-02-27
 Poetry.LA's video of C.K. Williams' reading at the 3rd Area Reading Series, PHARMAKA Gallery, Los Angeles, March 19, 2009
 The National Book Foundation C.K. Williams's acceptance speech for the 2003 Poetry Award for The Singing, reading his poem "The Doves." Accessed November 30, 2010
 'Song of Himself', review of On Whitman in the Oxonian Review
 "Poets in Person: C.K. Williams" (HD Video), A family visit with C.K. Williams at his home in Hopewell, NJ, The Cortland Review – Winter 2011 Feature.
 " C.K. Williams Memorial Reading, April 11, 2016" Kelly Writers House, University of Pennsylvania, Philadelphia.

1936 births
2015 deaths
20th-century American male writers
20th-century American poets
21st-century American male writers
21st-century American poets
American male poets
Brooklyn College faculty
Columbia High School (New Jersey) alumni
Deaths from multiple myeloma
Members of the American Academy of Arts and Letters
National Book Award winners
The New Yorker people
People from Hopewell, New Jersey
Poets from New Jersey
Princeton University faculty
Pulitzer Prize for Poetry winners
University of Pennsylvania alumni
Writers from Newark, New Jersey